Esther Levine (born 1970 in Frankfurt am Main) is a German born, New York based photographer. After studying photography at the City College of New York from 1994 to 1996 she enrolled in the documentary photography program at the International Center of Photography in New York City in 1996. Levine, a Leica photographer, has had exhibits in New York, Berlin, Buenos Aires, Switzerland, Guangzou and Mannheim, shot ad campaigns and had her work published in a variety of European magazines.

Her urban photo project has covered New York City (1997–), Berlin (1999–), Warschau (2003–) and Guangzhou (2005–).

Bibliography
 Berlin - the Urban Photo Project Edition J. H. Heckenhauer, 2006, .

Exhibitions
“New York” @ Leica Galerie, Frankfurt, 2006
Urban Photo Project, “Berlin” and “New York”@ Galerie Gordon & Pym, Paris,  2005
Urban Photo Project, “New York” @ Galerie J. J. Heckenhauer, Berlin,  2005
"Witness to a Century" @ Leica Gallery, New York, USA 2005
Urban Photo Project, “New York” @ Fototage Mannheim Ludwigshafen,  2005
"German Photography" @ Leica Gallery, New York, USA, 2005
"Global Cities" @ Canton, China, curated by Alain Julien, 2005
Urban Photo Project, “Berlin” @ Galerie J. J. Heckenhauer, Berlin, 2004
Festival de la Luz @ Buenos Aires,  2004
“Auf nach Europa”, in cooperation with Leica Deutschland, the FAZ und the French cultural institute in Frankfurt 2004
“Berlin” @ Half King, New York, USA 2004
"Berlin" @ Go Fish Gallery, New York, USA 2003
"New York Portrait" @ Paprika, New York, USA 2002
"Address" - Group Exhibit @ Paris, 2002
"Paris/Berlin" with Dolores Marat, Toit du Monde @ Vevey, 2001
Slideshow @ Voies Off - Rencontres Internationales de la Photographie @ Arles, 2001
Feature in Photo District News's 30 under 30 issue. 2001
Leica Gallery @ Photo Expo, New York, USA 2000
Slideshow @ Voies Off - Rencontres Internationales de la Photographie, Arles, 2000
Yearly Final Exhibit @ International Center of Photography, New York, USA 1997

See also
List of photographers

External links
Levine's website

1970 births
Living people
German emigrants to the United States
American photographers
Photographers from Frankfurt
American women photographers
German women photographers
21st-century American women